AC×DC (also known as Antichrist Demoncore) is an American hardcore punk band that formed in Los Angeles, California in 2003. The band has gone through multiple line-up changes and its current line-up consists of vocalist Sergio Amalfitano, guitarist Eddie Oropeza and bassist Ryan Corbett and drummer Jorge Luis Herrera. The band's musical style has been mainly labeled as powerviolence, as well as grindcore and hardcore punk with influences from D-beat, crust punk and death metal. The band's aesthetic has been described as "a strange blend of veganism, straight-edge and Satanism."

History
The band was formed in 2003 when the members were still in high school. Vocalist Sergio Amalfitano was invited to play in the band by an early guitarist, whom according to Amalfitano planned to form "a Spazz-type band, where the lyrics talk about Ninja Turtles and stuff." The band has generated controversy with some of their recordings, including He Had It Comin' EP (2005), which features a Vietnamese cop shooting a crucified Christ on cover. After entering a hiatus, original members Amalfitano and Jeff Aldape reformed AC×DC with a new line-up in 2010.

The band released its full-length debut album, Antichrist Demoncore in 2014. The album was produced by Taylor Young, who is known for his work for Nails and Twitching Tongues, and mastered by From Ashes Rise and The Cooters member Brad Boatright.

In June 2015, the band announced that it recorded 14 songs for new records and splits.

In 2017 the band took a year long hiatus.

ACxDC has returned from hiatus with new guitarist Eddie Oropeza to do some international touring in 2019.

The band announced their release of a sophomore album entitled Satan Is King (an ode to Kanye West's album Jesus is King) which became available on May 15, 2020 on Prosthetic Records.  It features the singles, Satan Is King, and Copsucker.

Members
Current members
Sergio Amalfitano — vocals
Eddie Oropeza — guitar
Ryan Corbett — bass
Jorge Luis Herrera — drums

Discography
Studio albums
Antichrist Demoncore (2014)
Satan Is King (2020)

EPs
He Had It Coming (2005)
The Second Coming (2012)
Postcard Flexi (2015)
The Oracles of Death (2016)

Splits
"Give Up Give In Quit!" - Double 7" Split with No Noise! (2005)
"10" Split with Magnum Force and Sex Prisoner" (2013)
"Split 7" with To The Point" (2013)
"Split 7" with Disparo (2016)
"Discography" - CD-R Split with Max Ward and Asshole Assassination Squad (release year unknown, given by the band when purchasing a shirt)

Live albums
TBFH Live Session (2012)
Beast Coast Tour Tape 2015 (2015)

Demos
Jack Trippin Demo (2004)
Live Noise/Demos/Unreleased (2011)

Compilation albums
A Sign Of Impending Doom (2005)
Take Your Cross Off And Join The Crowd (2012)
Discography 03-13 (2014)
He Had It Coming/The Second Coming (2014)

References

External links
 

Musical groups established in 2003
Musical quintets
Hardcore punk groups from California
Musical groups from Los Angeles
American grindcore musical groups
Powerviolence groups